Ambient music design is a fusion of original film score and sound design. It has elements of Ambient music and Drone music and is supposed to complement a specific scene or the entire movie, TV-series or video game.

The term was invented by Mel Wesson and Hans Zimmer in early 2000 when working on Hannibal and has since become a niche for Mel Wesson's sound. Mel has also made numerous production music CD's for Extreme Music which feature loosely some of the atmospheric textures in his world of ambient music design.

Ambient music design featuring Mel Wesson

Video games 

2010

 LIMBO

2009

 inFAMOUS

2007

 Call of Duty 4: Modern Warfare

Other projects 
 Inception Live Premiere Performance
 Inception: The App
 Inception: The Soundscape
 The Dark Knight: 2-CD Special Edition
 SOS Short Films: Electroland
 Shrek 4-D Universal Studios Theme Park Ride
 Various TV-series, theatrical teaser trailers, production music CD's, music albums, music videos and commercials

See also

 Mel Wesson (Wikipedia)

External links
 Mel Wesson Official Website

Ambient music